MV Black Marlin is a semisubmersible heavy-lift ship operated by Dockwise of the Netherlands. Black Marlin and her sister ship  comprise the Marlin class of heavy lift ship.

History 
Black Marlin was built at CSBC Corporation, Taiwan’s Kaohsiung shipyard for Offshore Heavy Transport ASA. She was launched in 1999. She was delivered on November, 18, 1999. As of 2019, she was sailing under the flag of Malta.

References

1999 ships
Heavy lift ships
Semi-submersibles
Ships built in the Republic of China